Alaginella is a genus of sea snails, marine gastropod mollusks in the family Marginellidae.

Species
Species within the genus Alaginella include:
 Alaginella aikeni Lussi, 2013
 Alaginella albino (Laseron, 1957)
 Alaginella atractus (Tomlin, 1918)
 Alaginella borda (Cotton, 1944)
 Alaginella brazieri (E.A. Smith, 1891)
 Alaginella carinata (E.A. Smith, 1891)
 Alaginella cottoni Boyer, 2001
 † Alaginella fraudulenta (Suter, 1917)
 Alaginella gatliffi (May, 1911)
 Alaginella geminata (Hedley, 1912)
 Alaginella kerochuta (Shackleford, 1914)
 † Alaginella labinensis (P. A. Maxwell, 1988) 
 Alaginella malina (Hedley, 1915)
 Alaginella ochracea (Angas, 1871)
 Alaginella pachia (R. B. Watson, 1886)
 † Alaginella parvisinus (P. A. Maxwell, 1992) 
 Alaginella pemphix (Roth, 1973)
 Alaginella pygmora (Laseron, 1957)
 † Alaginella totangiensis (Marwick, 1931) 
 Alaginella umlaasensis (Lussi & G. Smith, 1996)
 Alaginella valida (Watson, 1886)
 Alaginella vercoi (May, 1911)
 † Alaginella waikohuensis (Marwick, 1931) 
 Alaginella zeyheri (Krauss, 1852)
Species brought into synonymy
 Alaginella aupouria Powell, 1937 : synonym of Mesoginella aupouria (Powell, 1937)
 Alaginella sica Cotton, 1957: synonym of Alaginella vercoi (May, 1911)

References

 Cossignani T. (2006). Marginellidae & Cystiscidae of the World. L'Informatore Piceno. 408pp

Marginellidae
Gastropod genera